The Prince of Achaea was the ruler of the Principality of Achaea, one of the crusader states founded in Greece in the aftermath of the Fourth Crusade (1202–1204). Though more or less autonomous, the principality was never a fully independent state, initially being a vassal state subservient of the Latin Empire of Constantinople, which had supplanted the Byzantine Empire, and later of the Angevin Kingdom of Naples. During the Angevin period, the princes were often absent, being represented in the Principality by their baillis, who governed in their name.

The principality was one of the longest-lasting of the Latin states in Greece, outliving the Latin Empire itself by 171 years. It did not come to an end until 1432, when the Byzantine prince Thomas Palaiologos inherited the last remnants of the Principality through marriage to the daughter of the last prince, Centurione Zaccaria. With the Principality gone, the title of Prince of Achaea became vacant. The title was revived more than two centuries later, with Antonio di Tocco, a descendant of Thomas Palaiologos, proclaiming himself as the titular Prince of Achaea in 1642. The sequence of titular princes that began with Antonio di Tocco lasted until the death of his descendant Maria Maddalena Capece Galeota in 1933, whereafter the title became vacant once more.

List of princes of Achaea, 1205–1432

Champlitte dynasty (1205–1209) 

After a brief tenure as prince, William I received news that his brother Louis in Burgundy had died and decided to return home to France to claim the family lands. To govern the principality of Achaea, he left his old friend Geoffrey of Villehardouin as bailiff. William I died on his journey home in 1209. Champlitte had stipulated before his journey home that any lawful heir of his would have to claim the principality within a year and a day in the event of his death, or their claims would be forfeit. After his death, news reached Villehardouin that a cousin of William, Robert of Champlitte, was on his way to claim the principality. Wishing to claim the principality for himself, Villehardouin, with the assistance of Venice, placed various obstacles in Robert's way, including ensuring that he had to wait in Venice for two months before embarking, and once Robert reached Achaea, the time window stipulated by William had passed. Having obtained the principality through legal quibbles and fraud, Villehardouin was then proclaimed as the new Prince of Achaea.

Villehardouin dynasty (1210–1278)

Angevin domination (1278–1396)

House of Anjou (1278–1289)

Houses of Villehardouin, Avesnes and Savoy (1289–1307) 

In 1307, Charles II revoked the position of Isabella and Philip I, on the grounds that their marriage having happened without his consent (despite having recognized Philip earlier) and Philip's refusal to assist Charles II in the king's campaigns against the Despotate of Epirus. Isabella and Florent had been granted the principality in 1289 on the condition that Isabella did not remarry without Charles II's consent in the event of Florent's death and Philip's refusal to aid Charles II constituted a gross breach of the feudal code. Isabella's eldest daughter, Matilda of Hainaut, may have unsuccessfully attempted to claim the principality in the immediate aftermath of her parents' deposition but was blocked from doing so by the local nobility, who awaited orders from Naples. Instead of seizing Achaea for himself once more, Charles bestowed it on his favorite son, Philip of Taranto, who soon after arrived in Achaea and received the allegiance of the local barons. To ensure that Isabella and Philip did not attempt to reclaim Achaea, their claims were also purchased and the couple were promised to County of Alba on the shores of the Fucine Lake as compensation.

House of Anjou (1307–1313) 

In 1313, Philip II married Catherine of Valois, the titular Latin Empress, who had up until their marriage arrangements been betrothed to Hugh V, Duke of Burgundy. In order to compensate the House of Burgundy, it was arranged that Louis of Burgundy, Hugh V's younger brother, would marry Matilda of Hainaut, the eldest daughter of Isabella of Villehardouin, and that the two would then be granted the Principality of Achaea. After marriage, however, Louis and Matilda delayed in travelling to Greece and in the meantime, the usurper Ferdinand of Majorca seized control of the principality.

House of Barcelona (1315–1316)

Houses of Avesnes and Bourbon (1316–1321) 

After she was widowed in 1316, King Robert of Naples ruled that Matilda should marry his younger brother, John of Gravina, as part of a scheme to once more return the principality to the House of Anjou. Matilda however refused, and there was also protest from Odo IV of Burgundy, the brother and designated heir of Louis. Matilda was however brought to Naples by force and in 1318 compelled to go through with the marriage ceremony to John. Still defiant, the princess was brought before Pope John XXII at Avignon and there ordered to obey. Even when forced to marry by the pope, Matilda refused and replied that she had already married the Burgundian knight Hugh de La Palice, whom she was very attached to. This secret marriage gave Robert the excuse to revoke her position as Princess of Achaea, as she had not been allowed to marry without his consent per the agreements that preceded her elevation to the position. After a brief forced marriage to John, Matilda was imprisoned and the principality was simply bestowed upon John directly.

House of Anjou (1318–1381)

House of Baux (1381–1383)

Interregnum (1383–1396) 
James of Baux died childless in 1383, which left his hired army, the Navarrese Company, as the sole authority in Achaea. The commanders of the Navarrese Company, Mahiot de Coquerel (until 1386) and Peter of San Superano (after 1386) kept up the pretense that they were representatives of the Kings of Naples, the closest and strongest of the possible claimants to the principality, but they were for all intents and purposes rulers of an independent realm.

In addition to the nominal princes listed above, there were also numerous other rival claimants that rose during this time:
 Louis I of Anjou – designated heir of James of Baux.
Marie of Blois, Duchess of Anjou – widow and designated heir of Louis I of Anjou. Eventually sold her claim to Juan Fernández de Heredia of the Knights Hospitaller
 Louis II, Duke of Bourbon – nephew and designated heir of Maria I of Bourbon (who ruled as princess 1364–1370).
 Amadeo of Savoy – grandson of Philip I of Savoy (who ruled as prince 1300–1307).
Louis of Piedmont – brother and heir of Amadeo of Savoy.
 Juan Fernández de Heredia, Grand Master of the Knights Hospitaller – sought to regain the principality for the Knights Hospitaller, eventually succeeded in purchasing the claims of Marie of Blois, though the sale was contested by Amadeo of Savoy and Antipope Clement VII annulled it.

Navarrese-Genoese dynasty (1396–1432)

Timeline

Later claimants 

Upon the death of Centurione Zaccaria in 1432, his territories were inherited by Thomas Palaiologos, Despot of the Morea, who had married Centurione's daughter and heir, Catherine Zaccaria. Although Thomas thus ruled portions of the Peloponnese, including all of Centurione's former territory, and had rightfully inherited the title, he never used it, and the Principality of Achaea came to an end. Some modern historians consider Thomas Palaiologos to have been the Prince of Achaea from 1432 to 1460, though that is a modern historiographical designation for him. Thomas Palaiologos's inheritance did not go completely unchallenged. In 1453, John Asen Zaccaria, illegitimate son of Centurione, claimed his father's title and warred against Thomas and Thomas's brother Demetrios. John was defeated in 1454 and died in exile in 1469.

Some impostor pretenders to Byzantine descent historically claimed the position. From the late 15th century to 1530, the Albanian exile Constantine Arianiti claimed the title "Duke of Achaea", among others.  Later in the 16th century, the title might have been claimed by Giovanni Demetrio Angeli (1499–1571), part of the Angelo Flavio Comneno family, which claimed descent from the Byzantine Angelos dynasty.

Titular princes of Achaea, 1642–1933 
On 4 November 1642, Philip IV of Spain confirmed through a royal diploma the right of Antonio di Tocco to style himself as the titular Prince of Achaea. Though his ancestors had not used the title for more than two hundred years, Antonio held a legitimate claim to it, being descended from Thomas Palaiologos and Catherine Zaccaria in the female line. The last fully documented and certain male-line descendants of Thomas Palaiologos died off in the early 16th century and the Tocco family were descended from Thomas's eldest daughter, Helena Palaiologina.

Tocco family (1642–1884)

Capece Galeota family (1889–1933)

Notes

References

Bibliography

Web sources 

 
 

 
Lists of monarchs